Black Mass Lucifer is an electronic instrumental album by Mort Garson first released in 1971.

Background
The music is composed and performed entirely by Garson himself on Moog synthesizers. While this record exhibits elements of occult rock in a sometimes sinister tone, it is nonetheless in the vein of Garson's other synthesizer-based music. Black Mass Lucifer is described as employing sounds typical of modular synthesis such as "abstract electronic sound effects," "white noise bursts," "twittering scales," "percolating synthesizers," and "synthetic bells."

After Black Mass Lucifer's original 1971 release on Uni Records (owned by MCA), it was out of print for at least 35 years. In 2018 the album was reissued on CD by Rubellan Remasters via UMG.

Despite its low profile, the record has its fans, with one reviewer referring to it as "freaky and intense" and Garson's "masterpiece." Another noted that the record was created at the same time occult topics were highlighted in music (Black Sabbath), movies (Rosemary's Baby and The Exorcist), and recent events (the Tate murders).

Track listing

Personnel
Mort Garsoncomposition and realization
Eugene Hamblinelectronic engineering
Virginia Clarkjacket design
Dave Williamsdirection

References

Mort Garson albums
1971 albums